Warde V. Nichols (born March 23, 1969) was a member of the Arizona House of Representatives from 2003 through 2011. He was first elected to the House in November 2002, and was re-elected three times, in 2004, 2006, and 2008.  He was ineligible to run again in 2010 due to Arizona's term limits.

References

Republican Party members of the Arizona House of Representatives
1969 births
Living people